William Mortimer Brutton (1861 – date of death unknown) was a British architect.

Early life
He was born in Kensington, London, the second son (and second of three children) of William Courtenay Brutton (1831–1878), who was a solicitor, originally from Exeter his wife Hannah Bridge (1836–1879).

Career
Brutton has been described as a "prolific pub architect".

His works include the Fitzroy Tavern, a public house situated at 16 Charlotte Street in the Fitzrovia district of central London, to which it gives its name. The building was originally constructed as the Fitzroy Coffee House, in 1883, and converted to a pub (called “The Hundred Marks”) in 1887, by Brutton.

In 1896, Brutton designed the King's Head, Tooting, which CAMRA describe as "an historic pub interior of national importance".

Also in 1896, Brutton designed the St James's Tavern in Denham Street, in central London.

In 1897, Brutton was responsible for the remodelling and extension of the Alhambra Theatre in Leicester Square, now the site of the Odeon Leicester Square.

Brutton also designed the Princess Victoria in Shepherd’s Bush.

Personal life
In October 1880, he married Ada Louise Pidding (1864-). They had a daughter, Ethel Mortimer Brutton (1881-)

References

Architects from London
1861 births
Year of death missing